Ahmed Ghanem Soltan (born on 8 April 1986 in Giza) is an Egyptian footballer who currently plays for Egyptian Premier League side El Gouna. He is a graduate of the Zamalek SC youth academy; his father Ghanem Soltan was also a graduate of the Zamalek youth academy.

Ahmed had a brief stint in Poland, in which he won the Ekstraklasa League with Legia Warszawa. He is well known for his pace and ability to both defend and attack on the right wing.

He is the son of former Zamalek and Egypt club player Ghanem Soltan.

International career

Ghanem has represented Egypt at all youth levels, most notably at U20 level, including FIFA World Youth Cup 2005.

Honors

with Legia Warszawa
Polish Premier League (2006)

with Zamalek
Egyptian Cup (2008)

References

Living people
Zamalek SC players
Egyptian footballers
Legia Warsaw players
1986 births
Expatriate footballers in Azerbaijan
Expatriate footballers in Poland
Egyptian expatriates in Poland
Egyptian Premier League players
Association football wingers
FK Genclerbirliyi Sumqayit players